Tlustice is a municipality and village in Beroun District in the Central Bohemian Region of the Czech Republic. It has about 1,100 inhabitants.

References

External links

 (in Czech)

Villages in the Beroun District